Ablabesmyia moniliformis is a species of fly discovered by Ernst Josef Fittkau in 1962.  No sub-species specified in Catalogue of Life.

References

Tanypodinae
Insects described in 1962